Peter Politiek jr (born 1984, Singapore) is a former motorcycle racer from the Netherlands. Peter competed in the Dutch Superbikes and the German IDM Superbikes Championships. In the 2009 season, Peter took his first Dutch Superbikes pole position and win. Peter has been a testrider for Moto73 magazine since 2017.

2010 Dutch Superbikes: 4th 
2011 Dutch Superbikes: 11th

After running into many problems when switching teams and brands for the 2012 season, Peter decided to take a racing sabbatical and only competed in selected Dutch Superbikes races and AHRMA Vintage races in the 2012 season. Ending his professional racing career after the last Dutch Superbikes race in Assen in oktober of 2012.

Currently, Peter races in selected (international) events on modern and vintage motorcycles and still is a testrider for Moto73 magazine in the Netherlands.

Background:
Peter Politiek is a four time Dutch National show-jumping champion. He is still the youngest rider ever (age 8) to win a national championship in horseback riding in the Netherlands. 
Peter competed in the 2002 Dutch 250cc Grand Prix of the Netherlands as a wild-card at age 17. He is the youngest Dutch rider to start in the 250cc Grand Prix class of the MotoGP World Championships. He suffered a near fatal crash in a European Championship race nearly a month later. It put the Dutch rider into a (artificial) coma for 6 weeks. 
In 2006 Peter won two American Vintage Racing Championships when competing in the AHRMA championship series during his time in the USA.

References
http://www.teampolytech.com/?page_id=2
http://www.bikepower.nl/forum/algemeen/zwaar-ongeluk-peter-politiek-t862.25.html;wap2=
https://web.archive.org/web/20080327215140/http://www.mrtt-hugen.nl/politiek.html
https://web.archive.org/web/20091006183315/http://www.ma.org.au/AM/Template.cfm?Section=News5&Template=%2FCM%2FHTMLDisplay.cfm&ContentID=32772
http://www.garethjonesracing.com/PDF%20Results/Gareth%20Jones%20ONK%20Dutch%20Superbike%20champion.pdf
http://www.people9.com/name/Peter+Barber/viewvideo_699203.html
https://web.archive.org/web/20090427175722/http://www.politics59.com/

Dutch motorcycle racers
Singaporean emigrants to the Netherlands
Living people
1984 births